Somizi Buyani Mhlongo (born 23 December 1972) is a South African media personality, television presenter, actor and choreographer. In 1992, he appeared on the musical and political film, Sarafina! which gained him prominence. Mhlongo became lead choreographer for numerous shows and events, including the opening and closing ceremonies for the 2010 FIFA World Cup and 2013 Africa Cup of Nations.

After starring and taking part in the choreography of Sarafina!, Mhlongo also appeared in several films including drama film Cry, the Beloved Country (1995) as well as various television shows, including Idols South Africa and V Entertainment.

Early life 
Somizi Buyani Mhlongo was born on 23 December 1972, in Soweto, the largest township in Johannesburg, to South African actress Mary Twala and actor and comedian Ndaba Mhlongo. Through the influence of his parents, he became exposed to the entertainment industry at a young age. He had one sibling, a brother named Archie, who was fatally stabbed in 1985.

Career

Film and television 
Mhlongo's acting career began when he was 13, appearing on the film Scavengers in 1987. In 1992, he then joined the musical and political film, Sarafina! in which he played a character by the name of Fire, but nicknamed "Whacko". He also appeared in films including Kein Himmel über Afrika (1993) and Cry, the Beloved Country (1995).

Mhlongo was featured on the television series Tarzan: The Epic Adventures in 1996. His biggest judging duty was when he was appointed as the new judge for the eleventh season of Idols South Africa. He was also a lead judge on the former SABC 1 competition show Dance Your Butt Off alongside actress and dancer Khabonina Qubeka. In 2016, Mhlongo premiered his reality show Living the Dream with Somizi which aired on Mzansi Magic. Other TV credits include City Ses'la, Ayeye and 10 Over 10.

Mhlongo hosted various award shows notably being the South African Music Awards where he co-hosted for 3 consecutive years (2016, 2017 and 2018). On 26 April 2018, Mhlongo was the featured roastee in Comedy Central's annual roast special.

He co-hosted  KZN Entertainment Awards on 15 December 2020 with Pearl Thusi.

Choreography 
Mhlongo's debut choreography work was on the musical film Sarafina! He choreographed many prominent events including the opening and closing ceremonies for the huge international football association FIFA for the 2010 hosting in his home country South Africa. Mhlongo choreographed various award shows and events including Miss South Africa, Metro FM Music Awards, South African Music Awards and the Channel O Music Video Awards. He also danced, and was a choreographer for the gospel choir Joyous Celebration.

In 2017, Mhlongo released the dance workout DVD Grind! With Somizi, which was available at Verimark. The workout choreography had many elements of South African dance moves. Mhlongo also did several YouTube workout videos under the name Kwaitone Dance Fitness with Somizi.

Radio 
Starting on 3 April 2017, Mhlongo was one of the co-hosts of Metro FM breakfast show The Fresh Breakfast Show alongside the lead host DJ Fresh and soccer presenter Mpho Letsholonyane. On 30 March 2019, it was announced that he would be replaced by Relebogile Mabotja as the station reshuffled. Mhlongo was then moved to co-host #TheBridge – the show after the set and airing of The Fresh Breakfast Show timeslot.

Other ventures

Endorsements 
In 2017, Mhlongo was named the ambassador for the satellite service DStv as for his notability on Idols South Africa which airs on two of their channels – M-Net and Mzansi Magic. He then endorsed with the Department of Water and Sanitation later that year. He also endorsed McDonald's South Africa in being the face of McCafé Coach Sessions.

Writing 
On 29 June 2017, Mhlongo released his autobiographical book named Dominoes, Unbreakable Spirit. He co-wrote the book along with journalist and author Lesley Mofokeng. The book shares his life in showbiz, childhood, entertainment business, parents' roles, sexuality and friendship.

Music 
Mhlongo incorporated in Kwaito and gospel for his song releases in the 2000s, which critically and commercially failed. 

In 2017, he released his house-focused and gqom-influenced revival song "Ngibonile" featuring DJ and record producer Heavy K.

In 2021, Mhlongo recorded as a featured artist in Vusi Nova’s song “Ntandane”, from his Gospel-influenced album, “Ngumama”.

Personal life 
Mhlongo dated actress Palesa Madisakwane while in a relationship with an unnamed man. This led him to come out as bisexual. Madisakwane and Mhlongo welcomed their first child, Bahumi Madisakwane, on 19 February 1995. Mhlongo later described himself as gay, and the relationship with Madisakwane ended.

Mhlongo has kept his relationships private. However, in 2017 rumors surfaced that he was dating South African model and entrepreneur Mohale Tebogo Motaung. The two confirmed these rumors in 2018. Mhlongo proposed to Motaung while on their vacation in Paris, France. The two were married in a traditional wedding on 28 September 2019, and they had a white wedding on 30 January 2020.

Filmography

Film

Television

Choreography 
Miss South Africa
Metro FM awards
Afcon 2013 Opening and Closing Ceremonies
South African Music Award (SAMAs)
Fifa World Cup 2010 Opening and Closing Ceremonies
Joyous Celebration

See also 

 Theo Baloyi
 Mary Twala

References 

1972 births
Living people
South African choreographers
South African gay actors
South African LGBT broadcasters